STRBase in computational biology is a database of Short Tandem Repeats

See also

References

External links
 http://www.cstl.nist.gov/biotech/strbase/

Genetics databases
Repetitive DNA sequences
Genetic genealogy
DNA profiling techniques